Shinto music is the ceremonial and festive music of , the indigenous religion of Japan. Its origin myth is the erotic dance of Ame-no-Uzume-no-Mikoto which lured Amaterasu from her cave.

Kagura

 or 'entertainment of the gods' includes music, dance and poetry and comprises mi-kagura of the court, o-kagura of major shrines such as Ise Jingū, and village sato-kagura.

Forms
The repertoire includes eight forms that may be traced back to the eighth century: kagura-uta (kagura songs), azuma asobi (eastern entertainment), kume-uta (palace guard songs) ō-uta (big songs), onaibi-uta (night duty songs), ruika (funeral songs), ta-uta (field songs), and yamato-uta (Yamato songs).

Instruments

See also
Gagaku
Kagura
Dengaku
Matsuri
Traditional Japanese musical instruments

References

Music
Religious music
Gagaku
Articles containing video clips